Dzmitry Sivakou (born 15 February 1983) is a Belarusian discus thrower. He won a silver medal for the 1.75 kg discus throw at the 2002 IAAF World Junior Championships in Kingston, Jamaica, with his final throw of 62.00 metres.

Sivakou represented Belarus at the 2008 Summer Olympics in Beijing, where he competed for the men's discus throw. He threw the discus into the field at 61.75 metres, finishing fifteenth overall in the qualifying round.

References

External links

NBC 2008 Olympics profile

Belarusian male discus throwers
Living people
Olympic athletes of Belarus
Athletes (track and field) at the 2008 Summer Olympics
People from Mogilev
1983 births
Sportspeople from Mogilev Region